Corgatha dipyra is a species of moth of the family Erebidae. It is found in Australia.

The adult moth of this species has brown wings with submarginal lines and arcs of dark spots. The wingspan is about 1.5 cm.

Boletobiinae
Moths described in 1902